C. inornatus may refer to:
 Callosciurus inornatus, a squirrel species
 Caprimulgus inornatus, a nightjar species
 Chlorospingus inornatus, a bush-tanager species
 Copadichromis inornatus, a fish species
 Ctenotus inornatus, a skink species in the genus Ctenotus

See also
 Inornatus